Duino Gorin (born 26 March 1951 in Pellestrina) is a retired Italian professional footballer who played as a midfielder.

Career
Gorin played for 4 seasons (61 games, 2 goals) in the Serie A for A.S. Varese 1910 and A.C. Milan.

Personal life
Gorin's younger brother Fabrizio Gorin also played football professionally. To distinguish them, Duino was referred to as Gorin I and Fabrizio as Gorin II.

Honours
Milan
 Coppa Italia winner: 1976–77.

External links
Profile at Magliarossonera.it

1951 births
Living people
Italian footballers
Serie A players
Venezia F.C. players
S.S.D. Varese Calcio players
A.C. Cesena players
A.C. Milan players
A.C. Monza players
S.S. Teramo Calcio players

Association football midfielders
Imolese Calcio 1919 players